L'Auberge de Cendrillon (French for Cinderella's Inn) is a restaurant located in Fantasyland in Disneyland Paris, which opened in 1992 with the park. It is themed to the Disney movie Cinderella.

The Restaurant
The restaurant is located beside Le Château de la Belle au Bois Dormant (Sleeping Beauty Castle), in an old French inn-like building, resembling Cinderella's Castle from the movie, complete with a fountain of the princess at the entrance, her pumpkin-shaped carriage, and even the tower where she is locked up most of the time.

Along with the outside seating area in the garden, the building features five Renaissance-style rooms, all ornamented with pictures and tapestries depicting famous scenes from the movie. Here, guests can consume traditional French-inspired meals.

External links
 Photos Magiques - L'Auberge de Cendrillon
 DLRP Synopsis - L'Auberge de Cendrillon

References

Disneyland Park (Paris)
Cinderella (franchise)
Fantasyland
Amusement rides introduced in 1992